Uma Racing Sdn Bhd is a Malaysia brand of aftermarket motorcycle parts. It manufactures high cam, gear box, carburetor, clutch disc, valve, superhead and other parts.

History 
Uma Racing was established in September 2002 as a joint venture between Meng Kah Auto Parts Trading Sdn Bhd and Maju Motor Racing.

Dealership & Distributor 
There are over thousand of local authorized dealers in Malaysia, covering Peninsular Malaysia, Sabah and Sarawak. Besides, Uma Racing also distributes to Singapore, Philippines, Thailand, Vietnam, Greece, Indonesia, Cambodia and Bermuda. france

References

External links 

 

2002 establishments in Malaysia
Motorcycle manufacturers of Malaysia
Joint ventures
Auto parts suppliers of Malaysia
Malaysian companies established in 2002
Manufacturing companies established in 2002
Privately held companies of Malaysia
Malaysian brands